The Furman Historic District is a historic district in the community of Furman, Alabama, United States.  It was placed on the National Register of Historic Places on May 13, 1999.  The boundaries are roughly Old Snow Hill Road, Wilcox County Road 59, Burson Road, and AL 21.  It contains , 73 buildings, and 14 structures.

References

External links

 Historical Marker Database

National Register of Historic Places in Wilcox County, Alabama
Historic districts in Wilcox County, Alabama
Greek Revival architecture in Alabama
Historic districts on the National Register of Historic Places in Alabama